"Put the Blame on Mame" is a song by Allan Roberts and Doris Fisher, originally written for the classic film noir Gilda (1946) in which it was sung by the title character, played by Rita Hayworth with the singing voice of Anita Kert Ellis dubbed in.

In keeping with the film character Gilda being "the ultimate femme fatale", the song sung by her in two scenes facetiously credits the amorous activities of a woman named "Mame" as the true cause of three well-known cataclysmic events in American history: The Great Chicago Fire of 1871, the Great Blizzard of 1888 in New York City and the 1906 San Francisco earthquake. Mame is also credited with causing the fictional shooting of Dan McGrew during the Yukon Gold Rush, an event derived from a short narrative poem published in 1907 by Robert W. Service.

The song was later reprised as an instrumental version in another quintessential noir film, 1953's The Big Heat, when Gilda star Glenn Ford first meets Lee Marvin's character in a bar.  It is again played in 1954's Human Desire, also starring Glenn Ford.

It was later also recorded by: 
 Gypsy Rose Lee in the movie Screaming Mimi
 Gale Robbins in the movie The Fuller Brush Girl
 Nat Gonella & His Georgians
 Barbara Hale in the movie The Houston Story
 Liane Foly
 John Williams and His Orchestra
 Milt Herth Trio
 Somethin' Smith and the Redheads
 Tapio Rautavaara (in Finnish)
 Viktor Lazlo (for her debut album, She)
 Mark Murphy
 Nancy Murphy
 Lynda Carter performed the song while playing the title role in Rita Hayworth: The Love Goddess.
 Marjorie Lord in The Danny Thomas Show, season 5, episode 19
 Patsy Kensit in the film Prince of Shadows
A clip of Hayworth singing the song in Gilda was to be included in Michael Jackson's performance of "Smooth Criminal" in the planned show This Is It; the song was included in the posthumously released film version.

In 2004, "Put the Blame on Mame" finished #84 in AFI's 100 Years...100 Songs survey of the top tunes in American cinema.

References

External links
Hebrew version of the song at Zemereshet.co.il

Songs about fictional female characters
Film theme songs
1946 songs
Songs written for films
Songs written by Doris Fisher (songwriter)
Songs about Chicago
Songs written by Allan Roberts (songwriter)